The spike response model (SRM) is a spiking neuron model in which spikes are generated by either a deterministic or a stochastic threshold process. In the SRM, the membrane voltage  is described as a linear sum of the postsynaptic potentials (PSPs) caused by spike arrivals to which the effects of refractoriness and adaptation are added. The threshold is either fixed or dynamic. In the latter case it increases after each spike. The SRM is flexible enough to account for a variety of neuronal firing pattern in response to step current input. The SRM has also been used in the theory of computation to quantify the capacity of spiking neural networks; and in the neurosciences to predict the subthreshold voltage and the firing times of cortical neurons during stimulation with a time-dependent current stimulation. The SRM has been formulated in continuous time and in discrete time. The SRM can be viewed as a generalized linear model (GLM) or as an (integrated version of) a generalized integrate-and-fire model with adaptation.

Model equations for SRM in continuous time 
In the SRM, at each moment in time t, a spike can be generated stochastically with instantaneous stochastic intensity or 'escape function'

 

that depends on the momentary difference between the membrane voltage  and the dynamic threshold .

The membrane voltage  at time t is given by

 

The contributions to the voltage caused by a spike at time  are described by the refractory kernel . In particular,

 describes the time course of the action potential starting at time  as well as the spike-afterpotential.

The dynamic threshold  is given by

 

where  is the firing threshold of an inactive neuron and   describes the increase of the threshold after a spike at time . In case of a fixed threshold [i.e., =0], the refractory kernel  should include only the spike-afterpotential, but not the shape of the spike itself.

A common choice for the 'escape rate'   (that is consistent with biological data) is

 

For  the threshold becomes sharp and spike firing occurs deterministically at the moment when the membrane potential hits the threshold from below. The escape rate process via a soft threshold is reviewed in Chapter 9 of the textbook Neuronal Dynamics.

In a network of N SRM neurons , the membrane voltage of neuron  is given by

 

where  are the firing times of neuron j (i.e., its spike train), and  describes the time course of the spike and the spike after-potential for neuron i,   and  describe the amplitude and time course of an excitatory or inhibitory postsynaptic potential (PSP) caused by the spike  of the presynaptic neuron j. The time course  of the PSP results from the convolution of the postsynaptic current  caused by the arrival of a presynaptic spike from neuron j.

Model equations for SRM in discrete time 
For simulations, the SRM is usually implemented in discrete time. In time step  of duration , a spike is generated with probability

 

that depends on the momentary difference between the membrane voltage  and the dynamic threshold . The function F is often taken as a standard sigmoidal  with steepness parameter . But the functional form of F can also be calculated from the stochastic intensity   in continuous time as  where  is the distance to threshold.

The membrane voltage   in discrete time is given by

 

The input filter   and the spike-afterpotential  are defined as in the case of the SRM in continuous time.

For networks of SRM neurons in discrete time we define the spike train of neuron j as a sequence of zeros and ones,   and rewrite the membrane potential as

 

In this notation, the refractory kernel  and the PSP shape  can be interpreted as linear response filters applied to the binary spike trains .

Main applications of the SRM

Theory of computation with pulsed neural networks 
Since the formulation as SRM provides an explicit expression for the membrane voltage (without the detour via a differential equations), SRMs have been the dominant mathematical model in a formal theory of computation with spiking neurons.

Prediction of voltage and spike times of cortical neurons 
The SRM with dynamic threshold has been used to predict the firing time of cortical neurons with a precision of a few milliseconds. Neurons were stimulated, via current injection,  with time-dependent currents of different means and variance while the membrane voltage was recorded. The reliability of predicted spikes was close to the intrinsic reliability when the same time-dependent current was repeated several times. Moreover, extracting the shape of the filters    and   directly from the experimental data revealed that adaptation extends over time scales from tens of milliseconds to tens of seconds. Thanks to the convexity properties of the likelihood in Generalized Linear Models, parameter extraction is efficient.

Associative memory in networks of spiking neurons 
SRM0 neurons have been used to construct an associative memory in a network of spiking neurons. The SRM network which stored a finite number of stationary patterns as attractors using a Hopfield-type connectivity matrix was one of the first examples of attractor networks with spiking neurons.

Population activity equations in large networks of spiking neurons 
For SRM neurons, an important variable characterizing the internal state of the neuron is the time since the last spike (or 'age' of the neuron) which enters into the refractory kernel . The population activity equations for SRM neurons can be formulated alternatively either as integral equations, or as partial differential equations for the  'refractory density'. Because the refractory kernel may include a time scale slower than that of the membrane potential,  the population equations for SRM neurons provide powerful alternatives to the more broadly used partial differential equations for the 'membrane potential density'.

Spike patterns and temporal code 
SRMs are useful to understand theories of neural coding. A network SRM neurons has stored attractors that form reliable spatio-temporal spike patterns (also known as synfire chains) example of temporal coding for stationary inputs. Moreover, the population activity equations for SRM exhibit temporally precise transients after a stimulus switch, indicating reliable spike firing.

4. History and relation to other models 
The Spike Response Model has been introduced in a series of papers between 1991 and 2000. The name Spike Response Model  probably appeared for the first time in 1993. Some papers used exclusively the deterministic limit with a hard threshold others the soft threshold with escape noise. Precursors of the Spike Response Model are the integrate-and-fire model introduced by Lapicque in 1907 as well as models used in auditory neuroscience.

SRM0 
An important variant of the model is SRM0 which is related to time-dependent nonlinear renewal theory. The main difference to the voltage equation of the SRM introduced above is that in the term containing the refractory kernel there is no summation sign over past spikes: only the most recent spike matters. The model SRM0 is closely related to the inhomogeneous Markov interval process and to age-dependent models of refractoriness.

GLM 
The equations of the SRM as introduced above are equivalent to Generalized Linear Models in neuroscience (GLM).  In the neuroscience, GLMs have been introduced as an extension of the Linear-Nonlinear-Poisson model (LNP) by adding self-interaction of an output spike with the internal state of the neuron (therefore also called 'Recursive LNP'). The self-interaction is equivalent to the kernel  of the SRM. The GLM framework enables to formulate a maximum likelihood approach applied to the likelihood of an observed spike train under the assumption that an SRM could have generated the spike train. Despite the mathematical equivalence there is a conceptual difference in interpretation: in the SRM the variable V is interpreted as membrane voltage whereas in the recursive LNP it is a 'hidden' variable to which no meaning is assigned. The SRM interpretation is useful if measurements of subthreshold voltage are available  whereas the recursive LNP is useful in systems neuroscience where spikes (in response to sensory stimulation) are recorded extracellulary without access to the subthreshold voltage.

Adaptive leaky integrate-and-fire models 
A leaky integrate-and-fire neuron with spike-triggered adaptation has a subthreshold membrane potential generated by the following differential equations

 

 

Integration of the linear differential equations gives a formula identical to the voltage equation of the SRM. However, in this case, the refractory kernel  does not include the spike shape but only the spike-afterpotential. In the absence of adaptation currents, we retrieve the standard LIF model which is equivalent to a refractory kernel  that decays exponentially with the membrane time constant .

External links 
 Spike Response Model, Chapter 6.4 of the textbook Neuronal Dynamics
 'soft threshold' and escape noise, Chapter 9 of the textbook Neuronal Dynamics
 Quasi-Renewal Theory   Chapter 14 of the textbook Neuronal Dynamics.
 Spike Response Model, from Scholarpedia

Reference section 

Biophysics
Computational neuroscience
Neuroscience